Leselidze (Gyachrypsh) is a halt on the Psou - Engur railway line in Abkhazia. In some schedules it is listed as a halt at km 2,000.

According to 2003 data, it was listed in railway atlases as Leselidze platform of Georgian railways Samtredia department, station code 57441, code express 3 2800810. The actual platform relates to the Abkhaz railway stop at Gyachrypsh.

A small station building was built in the 1950s, but it was abandoned as of 2003.

From June 26, 2010, two pairs of commuter trains between Adler and Gagra stop here during the day.

The station layout consists of one high-side platform used for traffic in both directions.

See also
 Georgian Railway

Railway stations in Georgia (country)